CTP synthase 2 is an enzyme that in humans is encoded by the CTPS2 gene.

The protein encoded by this gene catalyzes the formation of CTP from UTP with the concomitant deamination of glutamine to glutamate. 

This protein is the rate-limiting enzyme in the synthesis of cytosine nucleotides, which play an important role in various metabolic processes and provide the precursors necessary for the synthesis of RNA and DNA. Cancer cells that exhibit increased cell proliferation also exhibit an increased activity of this encoded protein. 

Thus, this protein is an attractive target for selective chemotherapy. Two alternatively spliced transcript variants encoding the same protein have been described for this gene.

References

External links

Further reading